Karl Åke Henry Allard (21 November 1911 – 23 October 1996) was a Swedish politician (Social Democrat). He was a member of the Riksdag from 1943 until 1979. He was the Speaker of the Riksdag's second chamber 1969–1970, and became the first speaker of the unicameral Riksdag in 1971, a post he held until 1979.

His grandson Markus Allard is the founder and longtime leader of the local populist big-tent Örebro Party.

References

1911 births
1996 deaths
People from Örebro
Members of the Riksdag from the Social Democrats
Speakers of Andra kammaren
Speakers of the Riksdag
Swedish people of Walloon descent